Sanjeev Krishna, is a British physician and parasitologist whose research focuses on affordable diagnosis and treatment of diseases such as COVID-19, malaria, Ebola, African trypanosomiasis, leishmaniasis, and colorectal cancer. Krishna is Professor of Medicine and Molecular Parasitology at St George's, University of London and St George's Hospital.

Early life and education 
Sanjeev Krishna was born in Tanzania and attended a primary school run by English Catholic nuns. He expressed interest in medicine from an early age. His family operated a clinic where Krishna was first introduced to medicine. In 1969, at 11 years old, he went to boarding school at King's College in Taunton, England. In 1976, he won a scholarship to Pembroke College, University of Cambridge, to read Natural Sciences. He then completed his medical degree from University of Oxford in 1982. Krishna later earned his Doctor of Science degree from the University of Cambridge in 2007.

Career and research 
After completing his postgraduate medical training, in 1985, Krishna began research towards a DPhil at the Weatherall Institute of Molecular Medicine in Oxford as a training fellow funded by the Medical Research Council. In 1994, he was awarded a Wellcome Trust Senior Research Fellowship in Clinical Science at St George's, University of London. He was later appointed Professor of Molecular Parasitology and Medicine at St George's, University of London and St George's Hospital.

Krishna has been studying malaria since the early 1980s. He has also studied a number of other infectious diseases including African trypanosomiasis and leishmaniasis. Krishna has made significant contributions to the understanding of membrane transporters in Plasmodium falciparum, a parasite that causes malaria, and identifying them as targets for pharmaceuticals. He pinpointed an inhibitor with efficacy in killing P. falciparum in cultures and animal models by targeting a hexose transporter his group was able to identify, clone, and study. In 2001, Krishna et al. also identified a P-type ATPase (PfATP4) in P. falciparum as a target for new drugs.

Krishna was a lead professor on the St George's University of London's Nanomal Project which began in 2012 to develop a point-of-care, affordable diagnostic device used to detect malaria infection and assay the drug resistance of the parasites. In 2015, Krishna and his team launched a crowd-funded study at St George's University of London looking at the efficacy of artesunate, an antimalarial drug, as a treatment for colorectal cancer. He also contributed to the development of vaccines for Ebola which were shown to be safe and effective in clinical trials by 2017, following the Ebola virus epidemic in West Africa that killed more than 11,000 people.

During the COVID-19 pandemic, St George's Hospital shifted all its research to focus on COVID-19 with Krishna and his colleague Tim Planche leading a diagnostics project. He was also involved in a study on how some people exposed to COVID-19 develop antibodies to the virus that causes the disease for almost two months after they are diagnosed. The study co-authored by Krishna found that between 2% and 8.5% of COVID-19 patients in the study did not test positive for COVID-19 antibodies.

Memberships and honours 
In 2004, Krishna was inducted a Fellow of the Academy of Medical Sciences. He serves or has served on advisory committees of the World Health Organization (WHO), the United States National Institutes of Health, Wellcome Trust, and as an advisor to the Foundation for Innovative New Diagnostics. Krishna also serves on the Guidelines Development Group for malaria chemotherapy at the WHO Global Malaria Programme.

Personal life 
In 1999, Krishna married his wife Yasmin, who initially worked in finance and later became a teacher. They have a son Karim, born in 2000.

Krishna is an avid amateur squash player.

Selected publications

References

External links 
 

Alumni of Pembroke College, Cambridge
Alumni of the University of Oxford
British parasitologists
Fellows of the Academy of Medical Sciences (United Kingdom)
Living people
People educated at King's College, Taunton
Physicians of St George's Hospital
Year of birth missing (living people)